Michael F. Rush is a Democratic member of the Massachusetts Senate, representing the Suffolk and Norfolk district.  This includes Boston, ward 18, precincts 7 to 20, inclusive, 22 and 23, ward 19, precincts 10 to 13, inclusive, and ward 20, in the county of Suffolk; and Dedham, Norwood and Westwood, in the county of Norfolk.

He previously served in the Massachusetts House of Representatives, representing the 10th Suffolk District from 2002 to 2010.

Background 
Prior to being elected to the state legislature, Rush was a history teacher at his alma mater, Catholic Memorial High School in West Roxbury. He also taught at the Newman School in Boston's Back Bay.

Rush is a Commander in the United States Navy, where for the past thirteen years he has served in the Reserve component following his active duty training. He is currently assigned to NATO Deploy Charlie and was formally assigned to the Joint Central Command. Prior to serving as a commissioned officer, Rush traveled both home and abroad on peacetime construction projects as an enlisted sailor with Naval Mobile Construction Battalion 27, better known as the Seabees.

Education 
Rush holds a JD from Southern New England School of Law as well as a Master of Arts degree with distinction in United States History and a Bachelor of Arts degree with a double major in history and political science from Providence College. He is also a member of Phi Alpha Theta, the International Honor Society for Historians.

Rush was the president of his high school class at Catholic Memorial High School and college class at Providence.  He also attained the rank of Eagle Scout in the Boy Scouts of America.

Career as a legislator 
In the 2009–2010 Legislative session, House Speaker Robert DeLeo appointed Rush to serve on the House Committee on Ways and Means, the Joint Committee on Natural Resources and the Environment, and the Joint Committee on Labor and Workforce Development. Previously, he had served on the Joint Committees of Judiciary, Revenue, Public Service, Public Safety and Homeland Security.

Rush also served as the House Historian, having been appointed to the position by former Speaker Thomas Finneran.

Having been elected by his colleagues in the House and Senate as chairman of the Boston Legislative Delegation, Rush works as the liaison on legislative matters between Boston's Mayor Tom Menino and the city council and the legislature.

Rush is the chairman and founder of the State Parks Caucus. As such, he has been successful in securing more funds for state parks and creating a stronger collaboration between legislators whose districts encompass state park lands and the Department of Conservation and Recreation.

Rush is the 2009 recipient of the Marine Corps League's Semper Fidelis Public Servant Award, as well as the Boston Police Emerald Society's Man of the Year Award.

State Senate

Veterans 
Senator Rush was the main sponsor of the Veterans' tax credit added to the FY18 Budget. The tax credit provides up to $2,000 for each veterans hired to businesses with fewer than 100 employees who participate in a veterans hiring certification program at the Department of Veterans' Services. The tax credit also requires the department to develop a comprehensive program to improve employment opportunities and outcomes among veterans by providing guidance to businesses in attracting, hiring, training, and retraining veterans.

Rush led the movement to pass S.2509, An Act relative to veterans' benefits, rights, appreciation, validation and enforcement (also known as the BRAVE Act). Among other things, this bill provides paid military leave for state employees called to duty by the armed forces for up to 40 days for training and operation purposes. It also increases the burial expense funds paid by the Commonwealth from $2,000 to $4,000 for indigent veterans. The bill was signed by Governor Charlie Baker and was included in Chapter 218 of the Acts of 2018.

See also
 2019–2020 Massachusetts legislature
 2021–2022 Massachusetts legislature

References

External links
Massachusetts General Court - State Representative Michael F. 'Mike' Rush official MA House website
Project Vote Smart - Representative Michael F. 'Mike' Rush (MA) profile
Follow the Money – Michael F. 'Mike' Rush
2006 2004 2002 campaign contributions

Living people
Democratic Party members of the Massachusetts House of Representatives
Democratic Party Massachusetts state senators
Providence College alumni
21st-century American politicians
Catholic Memorial School alumni
Schoolteachers from Massachusetts
1973 births